Michael O'Kennedy (21 February 1936 – 15 April 2022) was an Irish Fianna Fáil politician who served as Minister for Labour from 1991 to 1992, Minister for Agriculture, Fisheries and Food from 1987 to 1991, European Commissioner for Personnel, Administration and the Statistics Office from 1981 to 1982, Minister for Finance and Minister for the Public Service from 1979 to 1980, Minister for Economic Planning and Development from 1979 to 1980, Minister for Foreign Affairs from 1977 to 1979, Minister for Transport and Power from January 1973 to March 1973, minister without portfolio from 1972 to 1973 and Parliamentary Secretary to the Minister for Education from 1970 to 1973. He served as a Teachta Dála (TD) for the Tipperary North constituency from 1969 to 1981, 1982 to 1992 and 1997 to 2002. He was a Senator for the Cultural and Educational Panel from 1965 to 1969 and for the Administrative Panel from 1993 to 1997.

Early life
O'Kennedy was born in Nenagh, County Tipperary, into a family that had strong links to Sinn Féin and the Old IRA. He was educated locally at St. Mary's national school before later attending St Flannan's College in Ennis, County Clare. He briefly studied for the priesthood at St Patrick's College, Maynooth, where he was a contemporary of future Social Democratic and Labour Party leader John Hume. After securing first place in a university scholarship in 1953, O'Kennedy obtained an MA degree from University College Dublin. He taught in Switzerland for a while before resuming his legal studies; he was subsequently called to the Bar in 1961. Twelve years later, he was appointed Senior Counsel.

Political career

Beginnings
O'Kennedy joined Fianna Fáil in 1957 and became an active party member. He contested the 1965 general election in Tipperary North; however, he narrowly failed to win a seat. He later secured election to Seanad Éireann, where he became party spokesperson on various issues, including finance and education.

O'Kennedy contested the 1969 general election and was successful in securing a seat in Dáil Éireann. He remained on the backbenches until 1970 when the Arms Crisis resulted in a major reshuffle at cabinet and junior ministerial levels. O'Kennedy became Parliamentary Secretary to the Minister for Education.

In December 1972, a cabinet reshuffle by Taoiseach Jack Lynch saw O'Kennedy join the cabinet as minister without portfolio. There was much speculation as to what portfolio he would take; however, the new year saw him become Minister for Transport and Power. His tenure was short-lived, for the 1973 general election saw a Fine Gael–Labour Party coalition government come to power.

Immediately after Fianna Fáil's loss of power, O'Kennedy was appointed Spokesperson on Foreign Affairs. He retained the same brief in a 1975 front bench reshuffle. After this reshuffle, he revealed his future leadership aspirations as he became associated with a hardline policy document regarding Northern Ireland. The paper called for a complete and immediate withdrawal of the British Government from Northern Ireland. This new policy opened up the old divisions in Fianna Fáil that had come to light during the Arms Crisis in 1970. It was also against the party's wishes and was at odds with party policy; however, O'Kennedy's new policy was welcomed by the hardline Republican element at the grassroots level within the party.

Cabinet minister and European commissioner
The 1977 general election saw Fianna Fáil return to power with a massive twenty-seat majority in the Dáil. O'Kennedy was appointed Minister for Foreign Affairs in Jack Lynch's new cabinet.

In 1979, Lynch suddenly resigned as Taoiseach and Fianna Fáil leader. The subsequent leadership contest was a straight battle between George Colley and Charles Haughey. Colley was the favoured choice of the outgoing leadership and the majority of the cabinet, while Haughey had the backing of a large rump of backbench TDs who had become disillusioned with the party leadership. On the day before the crucial vote, O'Kennedy was the only cabinet minister to endorse Haughey publicly. Many believe that it was because of this support that Haughey was successful in becoming Taoiseach, albeit by a narrow margin of just six votes. O'Kennedy's loyalty was rewarded when he was appointed Minister for Finance in the new government.

O'Kennedy's tenure as Minister for Finance was short-lived, delivering a stringent budget, as he took the position of European commissioner in January 1981. Because of his new appointment in Brussels, he also resigned from his Dáil seat. O'Kennedy took over as European Commissioner for Personnel, Administration and the Statistics Office and was disappointed not to be made vice-president in the Thorn Commission. He was, however, made a delegate to the president.

O'Kennedy's tenure in the European Commission was unhappy. He quickly grew bored of the mundane day-to-day work as a commissioner and missed the cut-and-thrust nature of Irish politics, which was going through a volatile period. A general election was called for February 1982, and O'Kennedy decided to return to contest his old seat. His gamble paid off as he was returned to the Dáil for Tipperary North once again and resigned as a European commissioner. O'Kennedy's return was seen as an attempt to assert his claim to the future leadership of Fianna Fáil, something that had been a contentious issue under Haughey and his failure to secure an overall majority in two elections. Fianna Fáil returned to power with the help of several Independent TDs, and O'Kennedy demanded a senior government position. His request was refused. Haughey did offer him the post of Attorney General, but O'Kennedy declined. As a result, he was left out of the short-lived administration.

The government fell in October that same year, and Fianna Fáil lost power at the subsequent general election. A period of instability followed within Fianna Fáil as several TDs attempted to oust Charles Haughey as party leader. Desmond O'Malley was seen as the clear front-runner to succeed Haughey; however, O'Kennedy's name was also mentioned alongside other party stalwarts like Gerry Collins and Brian Lenihan. In the end, Haughey survived as party leader.

Return to cabinet
Following the 1987 general election, Haughey was again Taoiseach and O'Kennedy returned to the cabinet as Minister for Agriculture and Food. This may have seemed like a demotion for someone with the experience of O'Kennedy; however, his nearly five-year tenure received praise from farming circles.

In November 1991, tensions arose within Fianna Fáil regarding the continued leadership of Haughey. Minister for Finance Albert Reynolds directly challenged the party leader and Taoiseach; however, the challenge failed. O'Kennedy supported the incumbent leader throughout the heave and took over as Minister for Labour in the subsequent reshuffle. Once again, this was viewed as a demotion; however, O'Kennedy viewed his role as one of the most important in the cabinet, considering the high unemployment rate.

In February 1992, Haughey eventually stepped down as Taoiseach and Fianna Fáil leader, and Albert Reynolds won the subsequent leadership election by a large majority. The formation of his new cabinet caused widespread shock as O'Kennedy and seven of his cabinet colleagues were effectively sacked in favour of supporters of the new Taoiseach. This effectively brought his cabinet career to an end.

Later years
Worse was to follow as O'Kennedy lost his seat at the 1992 general election, in what turned out to be a disaster for Fianna Fáil. He subsequently secured election to Seanad Éireann for the second time in his career.

O'Kennedy was re-elected to the Dáil at the 1997 general election. That same year he sought the Fianna Fáil nomination for President of Ireland but received only 21 votes out of a total of 112, as Mary McAleese became the party's nominee and eventual victor of the election.

After the 2002 general election, O'Kennedy retired from national politics. He returned to work as a barrister and subsequently became a member of the Refugee Appeals Tribunal.

O'Kennedy died on 15 April 2022, aged 86.

References

1936 births
2022 deaths
Alumni of St Patrick's College, Maynooth
Alumni of University College Dublin
Fianna Fáil senators
Fianna Fáil TDs
Irish European Commissioners
Members of the 11th Seanad
Members of the 19th Dáil
Members of the 20th Dáil
Members of the 21st Dáil
Members of the 23rd Dáil
Members of the 24th Dáil
Members of the 25th Dáil
Members of the 26th Dáil
Members of the 20th Seanad
Members of the 28th Dáil
Ministers for Agriculture (Ireland)
Ministers for Finance (Ireland)
Ministers for Foreign Affairs (Ireland)
Ministers for Transport (Ireland)
Parliamentary Secretaries of the 19th Dáil
People educated at St Flannan's College
People from Nenagh
Politicians from County Tipperary
Alumni of King's Inns
European Commissioners 1981–1985